Ron Richards (born June 5, 1963, in Oshawa, Ontario) is a Canadian former ski jumper. He represented the Canadian national team at the 1984 Winter Olympics in Sarajevo, Yugoslavia; the 1988 Winter Olympics in Calgary, Canada; and the 1992 Winter Olympics in Albertville, France. Richards is also an avid golfer.

References

1963 births
Living people
Canadian male ski jumpers
Olympic ski jumpers of Canada
Ski jumpers at the 1984 Winter Olympics
Ski jumpers at the 1988 Winter Olympics
Ski jumpers at the 1992 Winter Olympics
Sportspeople from Oshawa